Zenodochium is a genus of moths in the family Blastodacnidae described by Lord Walsingham in 1908.

Species
Zenodochium monopetali Walsingham, 1908
Zenodochium polyphagum Walsingham, 1908
Zenodochium sostra Walsingham, 1910
Zenodochium xylophagum Walsingham, 1908

References

Blastobasidae genera